The Danuta Gleed Literary Award is a Canadian national literary prize, awarded since 1998. It recognizes the best debut short fiction collection by a Canadian author in English language. The annual prize was founded by John Gleed in honour of his late wife, the Canadian writer Danuta Gleed, whose favourite literary genre was short fiction, and is presented by The Writers' Union of Canada. The incomes of her One for the Chosen, a collection of short stories published posthumously in 1997 by BuschekBooks and released by Frances Itani and Susan Zettell, assist in funding the award.

Initially Can$5,000, the prize money increased to Can$10,000 in 2004. The runners-up each receive Can$500. The nominations must be submitted before the end of January. The year's shortlist is chosen by a jury. The varying jury is composed of Canadian writers, literary critics and publishers, such as Gail Anderson-Dargatz, Robin McGrath and Hal Niedzviecki in 2012 or Douglas Glover, J. Jill Robinson and Claire Holden Rothman in 2011.

The first winning work was Curtis Gillespie's The Progress of an Object in Motion.

In 2010, Joey Comeau's Overqualified was withdrawn, as the writer already published a debut work.  Only two books were shortlisted in 2010 (the fewest in the history of the award).  However, the 2010 judges called the winning work Wax Boats by Sarah Roberts "truly remarkable," speaking of her versatility and her convincing writing in every conceivable voice, and likening her to Stephen Leacock's Sunshine Sketches of a Little Town for the modern age.

Winners and nominees

1. Comeau's Overqualified was withdrawn as it was not his debut short fiction collection. He already self-published It’s Too Late to Say I’m Sorry in 2007.

References 
General
Official site of the Danuta Gleed Literary Awards with a list of awardees
List of winners, runners-up and other shortlisted people
Specific

Canadian fiction awards
Short story awards
First book awards
Awards established in 1998
1998 establishments in Canada